Khauk mont is a traditional Burmese snack or mont.

This snack is a thin and crispy folded crepe made with a batter of rice flour and jaggery, and filled with fresh coconut shavings, and optionally with other fillings like red bean. similar to Thai khanom bueang.

References

Burmese cuisine
Pancakes
Burmese desserts and snacks
Rice cakes